Kurt Svensson may refer to:
Kurt Svensson (footballer)
Kurt Svensson (ice hockey)